The Bulavin Rebellion or Astrakhan Revolt (Восстание Булавина, Vosstaniye Bulavina) was a war which took place in the years 1707 and 1708 between the Don Cossacks and the Tsardom of Russia. Kondraty Bulavin, a democratically elected Ataman of the Don Cossacks, led the Cossack rebels. The conflict was triggered by a number of underlying tensions between the Moscow government under Peter I of Russia, the Cossacks, and Russian peasants fleeing from serfdom in Russia to gain freedom in the autonomous  Don area. It started with the 1707 assassination of Prince , the leader of Imperial army's punitive expedition to the Don area, by Don Cossacks under Bulavin's command. The end of the rebellion came with Bulavin's death in 1708.

Underlying causes
A number of social grievances were prevalent in the peasant population of Russia in the years leading up to the Bulavin Rebellion.  Peter the Great's radical reforms designed to "Westernize" old Muscovy in the 18th century were met with widespread discontent.  The pious, deeply conservative masses saw his reforms as an affront to their traditional way of life and to their Eastern Orthodox faith.  Peter was even equated to the Anti-Christ and assumed to be an impostor posing as the true Tsar.  On top of this, Peter's newly formed police state was expanding territorially, and by this expansion was encroaching upon salt resource sites coveted by the Cossacks for preservation of their foods.  This dispute over land was in one sense an economic issue, but the Cossacks also regarded this as an intrusion upon their semi-autonomous political state.  In general, the entire rural Russian atmosphere was in an agitated state, waiting for a catalyst of some kind.

Immediate catalyst
In response to the constraints and fears of living in Peter's police state, large numbers of serfs absconded, abandoning the major urban areas, especially Moscow and the new capital at St. Petersburg.  While some groups emigrated to Poland or Austria, many chose to avoid the border patrols and instead fled to the rural periphery and the river regions already inhabited by the Cossacks.  It was Peter's policy to hunt down and arrest absconders and return them to their lords where they could be counted for taxes, a policy which, by this time, had no statute of limitations.  In accordance with this policy, Peter deployed a group of bounty hunters under Yuri Dolgorukov to scout the Cossack regions for fugitive peasants.  Despite the fact that the Cossacks harbored some resentment towards the peasants (for overpopulating their region and generally competing for local resources), more deplorable to them was the idea of Petrine agents roaming freely through their territory.  They not only refused to give up the fugitive peasants, but on 8 October 1707 a small band of local atamans headed by Kondraty Bulavin ambushed and murdered Dolgorukov and his men in the village of Shulgin on the Aidar River, opening the door to violence and beginning the Bulavin Rebellion.

Bulavin the man

Little is known about Bulavin personally, but he was born into a Cossack family and would have been old enough to remember Stenka Razin and the revolt of the late 17th century.  He developed some combat experience fighting the Kuban and Crimean Tatars in his youth.  However, he was never a particularly great military commander, and throughout the rebellion that bears his name, he would forever fall short of becoming an undisputed leader.  By 1704, he had risen to the status of ataman of Bakhmut, a position he held until 1706.  It was during this stint that he orchestrated and participated in the destruction of the salt works on the Severski Donets, an act of retaliation for having been evicted by the government as squatters.  This conflict was never entirely resolved and was ultimately absorbed into the greater rebellion as it gained momentum.  Bulavin was most likely illiterate, but like his contemporary revolutionaries, he possessed a talent for appealing to the people and inciting them to action.

General details
Bulavin's rally cries were simple: the goal was to move against Moscow and destroy the evil influences on the Tsar.  It is important to note that the rebellion was not against the institution of Tsardom but against the figures in power at the time.  It was generally believed that Peter was either not who he claimed (i.e. the Antichrist sitting in place of the true Tsar who was hidden away), or that he was indeed the rightful Tsar but was under the control of evil advisers whose destruction would liberate him, and that if given the freedom to act, he would repudiate all of his wicked reforms.

The rebellion suffered from a number of weaknesses.  For one, despite all of his rallying, Bulavin never offered a pretender to the throne or suggested a just tsar to replace Peter.  This blunder would condemn the rebellion's end goals to ambiguity and would let slip an immeasurable amount of support he might have mustered.  Second, Bulavin did not coordinate his efforts with any other pre-existing Muscovite enemies, so despite being heavily engaged in war with Sweden, the  military apparatus under Peter was not as divided as it could have been and found the rebellion to be more of a nuisance than a major conflict.  By means of its vastly superior size and efficiency, the regular army was ultimately capable of stamping out the rebellion at all levels.  In the end, angered by devastating reversals and Bulavin's tiring claims, factions of his own Cossack followers turned against him.  He was found dead on 7 July 1708, having been shot in the head.  It is not known whether the wound was self-inflicted or an act of treachery.  Following Bulavin's death, the rebellion petered out, with pockets of resistance persisting through 1709, but for all intents and purposes, the conflict was over.

Political and social aftermath
As mentioned, the Bulavin Rebellion bore striking similarities to Razin's Revolt a generation earlier.  Both were Cossack rebellions in part, aimed against an imposing governmental institution and driven by animosity for the miserable state of peasant life.  They effectively set the stage for the Pugachev Uprising under Catherine the Great.

In response to the uprising, Peter tightened his grip on the Cossack states, causing some 2000 under Ignat Nekrasov to flee to the protection of the Crimean Khanate.  Descendants of these Nekrasovites would relocate to Anatolia during the Pugachev Uprising and settle near Constantinople, where their traditional culture would continue to the present day.

References

Notes

Sources
Evgenii V. Anisimov, The Reforms of Peter the Great: Progress Through Coercion in Russia,  Tr. John T. Alexander (Armonk, NY: Me. Sharpe, 1993)
Paul Avrich, Russian Rebels, 1600–1800, (New York, 1972)
James Cracraft, ed., Major Problems in the History of Imperial Russia, (Lexington, MA: D.C. Heath and Company, 1994)
Nicholas V. Riasanovsky, Mark D. Steinberg, A History of Russia, 7th ed., (New York: Oxford Univ. Press, 2005)

External links
Biography of Bulavin

Conflicts in 1707
Conflicts in 1708
Bulavin
Bulavin
Bulavin
Peasant revolts
1700s in Russia
18th-century rebellions
1707 in Russia
1708 in Russia
18th century in the Zaporozhian Host
Peter the Great